China Pharmaceutical University (CPU) is a university in Nanjing, China that specializes in the pharmaceutical sciences. It is one of national key universities under the Double First Class University Plan and former “Project 211” and universities selected for the "985 Innovative Platforms for Key Disciplines Project" affiliated with the Chinese Ministry of Education, also, the university is included in the Double First Class University Plan designed by the Chinese central government.

History

Rank
According to the 2018 statistics of the Ministry of Education of China, CPU's Pharmacy discipline ranks No. 1 and Traditional Chinese Pharmacy discipline ranks No. 3 among all Chinese universities.
According to US News Ranking 2021, China Pharmaceutical University ranked No.1 in pharmacy in the national ranking,#15th in pharmacy and pharmacology in the global ranking

Campus
CPU is located in the ancient capital of Nanjing and comprises two campuses including Xuanwumen campus located in downtown Nanjing and Jiangning campus in the southeast outskirts of Nanjing.

Schools and departments
CPU consists of six schools (School of Pharmacy, School of Traditional Chinese Pharmacy, School of life science and Technology, School of International Pharmaceutical Business, School of Continuing Education, and School of Higher Vocational Education), four independent departments (Dept. of Basic Sciences, Dept. of Foreign Languages, Dept. of Social Sciences, and Dept. of Physical Education), and five key labs and centers at state or provincial levels.

Programs
CPU offers 20 bachelor's degree programs, 29 master's programs, 24 doctoral programs and 6 post-doctoral fellowship programs. There are three  Pharmaceutical Chemistry, Pharmacognosy, Pharmaceutics and one provincial key discipline—Modern Traditional Chinese Pharmacy and Pharmacognosy.

Featured programs
Approved by the Ministry of Education, CPU established “Basic Pharmaceutical Science Base Class” and “National Bio-science and Technology Base Class”. Biological Technology Class (Bio-chemistry advanced class) is co-established with Nanjing University. The class has been recruiting students for 10 years and has cultivated a considerable number of high-quality talents. The class adopts a rolling system. Every year, about top 60% students are recommended for their master's and doctoral study.

Faculty
Among the 530 faculty members, 2 are academicians (members of the Chinese Academy of Sciences and the Chinese Academy of Engineering), and more than 40% have advanced academic titles. So far, the university has undertaken more than 70 research projects financed by the State Key Programs Foundation, and more than 300 research projects financed by the State Natural Sciences Foundation and the State New Drug Research Foundation. There are also fundings from other national, provincial and municipal departments. Many projects have reached the international level and filled the gaps in the country's pharmaceutical field.

Students
At , CPU has 16,144 full-time students, including 383 international students from more than 40 countries. CPU is the only institution that is authorized by the Ministry of Education to admit full-time pharmacy students, continuing education students and senior visiting scholars from overseas. It is also one of the higher educational institutions in the mainland for students from Hong Kong, Macao and Taiwan.

International
The university is also active in international academic exchanges. It has made academic exchange agreements with more than 30 higher education institutions in different countries and regions of the world, including Japan, the United States, UK, Australia, Italy and Hong Kong. In addition, it maintains academic relationships with research institutions and universities in more than 40 countries and regions.

See also
Pharmacy in China
Pharmaceutical industry in China
List of medical schools in the People's Republic of China

References

http://en.cpu.edu.cn/

External links
Official website 
3d map of China Pharmaceutical University

Universities and colleges in Nanjing
Pharmacy schools in China
Project 211